The LVG E.I was a German two-seat monoplane of World War I. The E.I was unusual among monoplanes of its time in that it featured ailerons as opposed to the then-conventional (for monoplanes) wing warping.

It was fitted with both a rearward firing machine gun, mounted on a flexible ring mounting, and a forward firing synchronized machine gun and was very probably the first aircraft to be so armed.

The only prototype was destroyed on its way to the front for testing in 1915; as such, very little is known about the E.I, or its synchronization gear.

List of operators

Specifications

Bibliography

 

1910s German fighter aircraft
E.I
Aircraft first flown in 1915